Cornelis Engelsz. (1575–1650) was a Dutch Golden Age painter and the father of Johannes Cornelisz Verspronck.

Biography
Engelsz was born in Gouda.  According to Houbraken, he was a pupil of Karel van Mander and a colleague of Frans Hals in Haarlem.

The Frans Hals Museum has several works by him and his son, the portrait painter Johannes Cornelisz Verspronck. According to the RKD he was a pupil of Cornelis Cornelisz and he became a member of the Haarlem Guild of St. Luke in 1593 and was from 1594 to 1621 a member of the schutterij there that he painted in 1618.  He died in Haarlem.

Works

References

1575 births
1650 deaths
Dutch Golden Age painters
Dutch male painters
People from Gouda, South Holland
Artists from Haarlem
Painters from Haarlem